Lee Buchanan may refer to:

 H. Lee Buchanan III, United States Assistant Secretary of the Navy
 Lee Buchanan (basketball) (born 1961), American college basketball coach
 Lee Buchanan (footballer) (born 2001), English association footballer for Derby County
 Lee L. Buchanan (1893–1958), American entomologist